Scott Klemmer is a human-computer interaction, user-centered design, usability, and computer science researcher and educator. He co-founded the Design Lab with Don Norman and Jim Hollan at the University of California San Diego in 2013. Klemmer is a professor in the Departments of Cognitive Science and Computer Science and Engineering, and formerly at Stanford University. His former advisees include the founders of the unicorn startups Instagram and Instabase.

Klemmer has researched Massive Open Online Courses (MOOC)s, and peer learning and feedback, design thinking, prototyping, iterative design, research ethics and methods, crowdsourcing, and coordination, among other things. He leads the Interaction Design specialization on Coursera.

Education
Klemmer attended Brown University from 1995-1999, and received undergraduate degrees in Art-semiotics and Computer Science. He went on to pursue art and graphic design, and worked in Palo Alto, CA at Interval Research Lab.

He attended the University of California Berkeley, where he received a Masters and completed his PhD in 2004.

Awards and honors
 Katayanagi Emerging Leadership Prize
 Sloan Research Fellowship
 National Science Foundation Career award
 Microsoft Research New Faculty Fellowship
 Editorial board for the ACM Transactions on Computer-Human Interaction (TOCHI)
 Previous program co-chair for UIST, the CHI systems area, and HCIC

References

External links
 Postcards from the future Scott Klemmer at TEDxSanDiego, 2016.
 Higher Learning via Massive Open Online Courses (MOOCs). University of California Television.
 Scott Klemmer. Interviewing: Human-Computer Interaction. Daily Motion.

Year of birth missing (living people)
Living people
Human–computer interaction researchers
Brown University alumni
University of California, Berkeley alumni
American computer scientists